The Dinera fly is a genus of tachinid flies in the family Tachinidae. Most larvae are parasitoids of Coleoptera (Scarabaeidae).

Species

Dinera angustifrons Zhang & Shima, 2006
Dinera borealis Zhang & Fu, 2012
Dinera brevipalpis Zhang & Shima, 2006
Dinera carinifrons (Fallén, 1817)
Dinera chaoi Zhang & Shima, 2006
Dinera ferina (Fallén, 1817)
Dinera fuscata Zhang & Shima, 2006
Dinera grisescens (Fallén, 1817)
Dinera guangxiensis Zhang & Fu, 2012
Dinera longirostris Villeneuve, 1936
Dinera maculosa Zhang & Shima, 2006
Dinera miranda (Mesnil, 1963)
Dinera nigrisquama Zhang & Fu, 2012
Dinera orientalis Zhang & Shima, 2006
Dinera setifacies Zhang & Shima, 2006
Dinera sichuanensis Zhang & Shima, 2006
Dinera similis Zhang & Shima, 2006
Dinera takanoi (Mesnil, 1957)
Dinera xuei Zhang & Shima, 2006

References

Dexiinae
Tachinidae genera
Taxa named by Jean-Baptiste Robineau-Desvoidy